Sylheti cuisine represents the food culture of Sylhetis. Hatkora is a common fruit and used to cook different dishes with fish and meat. Enriched with Vitamin C and antioxidants, hatkora curry is best eaten with rice. Though Sylhetis are mainly rice and fish eaters, their culinary system is distinctly different to non-Sylhetis. Multicultural people of Barak Valley to Surma valley, and the Sylheti diaspora have influenced the Sylheti food and flavours practiced for ages. Among them, the culinary system of Khasi, Kuki and other tribes are noteworthy. The cuisine of Sylhet has grown up depending on the availability of plants and animals in the region. Mainly indigenous with some variety, food culture is performed among the Sylhetis that received some external influences as well. When the 360 disciples of Shah Jalal arrived in this region, they not only brought their distinct cultures but also brought distinct cooking styles of their own. Which included many meat dishes along with chicken, beef and goat cooked Mughlai, Middle-Eastern, and Northern Indian style. Mughlai Porota, Pilau, Korma, Kalia, Roast, Biriyani and Kofta for curry dishes while Zardah, Firni and Kheer for desserts have been also included.

It is said that Syed Tufuzzul Ali, a Sylheti who opened the first Indian food shop on Victoria Dock Road in London. Later, in the 1940s some entrepreneurial Sylhetis began setting up cafés and introduced curry and rice to the menu. But lack of confidence saw the Bangladeshis refer to their food as Indian. In the United Kingdom, more than 8 out of 10 Indian restaurants are owned by Bangladeshis, 95% of which come from Sylhet. Sylhet is not known for its cuisine, though 80% to 90% British curry-house trace their roots directly to Sylhet. Chefs from Sylhet region developed the British curry to a greater extent since the 1960s. Chicken tikka masala, invented by the Sylhetis is regarded as Britain's National dish since 2001, by Britain's foreign secretary Robin Cook. The birthday celebration of the British Prime Minister Tony Blair's daughter at a Bangladeshi restaurant proves the popularity of Sylheti cuisine. Historian Lizzie Collingham, in her 2005 book Curry: A Biography, coined that the Sylheti curry cooks converted “unadventurous British palates” to a new flavour spectrum.

Rice 

Most of the Bangladeshi people are accustomed to eating Una Bhat (boiled rice), except the Chittagonians and Sylhetis. In Sylhet region, the notable rices are Aush, Aman, Boro, Eri, Biroin, Kalojira, Sonali Jira etc. Ala Bhat (Atop rice) is the staple food of the Sylhetis. Atop rice is a little sticky and delicious. They also prefer glutinous rice to make different delicacy. Research found that Sylheti rice has a lower arsenic concentration than similar types of rice from other regions of Bangladesh. According to the journal Biomedical Spectroscopy and Imaging, the Sylheti rice contained higher amounts of the essential nutrients selenium and zinc. Several varieties of Sylheti aromatic rice are also lower arsenic contaminated than the well-known Basmati aromatic rice from India and Pakistan.

Akhni 
 
Akhni is a mixed rice dish made of ghee, meat, vegetables etc. It is known as Akhni Birani and Akhni Fulaw as it is considered to be a particular variation of biryani or polao. It is a popular dish in the month of Ramadan, and any special occasion.

Biroin Bhat 
Biroin Bhat is one type of glutinous rice popular in Sylhet region. There is a special type of red-and-white sticky aromatic Biroin Rice is found only in the Sylhet region. This aromatic biroin chaul is cooked and eaten with fried fish, meat or kebab, khirshah rasmalai, date molasses etc. Biroin Chal is an organic rice cultivated in the highland of Sylhet and Chottogram. It is the main ingredients for Chunga Pitha, a traditional rice cake in the Sylhet region.

Khichuri 
 
Soft khichuri or simply khichuri is one kind of rice-based meal which is similar in consistency to porridge. It is a traditional food in Sylheti cuisine. During the holy month of Ramadan, it is served at most dinner tables as a staple food for iftar. To cook khichuri, aromatic rice is mixed with various spices including ghee, cumin and fenugreek. It is also eaten as a comfort food for sickness, in which case ginger is often added as a soothing ingredient. There are two types of khichuri; white (jau or zau) and yellow (bhuna) khichuri.

Meat 
Curries made with pastes of fresh and dried chillies, roots and spices are very favourite to Sylhetis.

Sylheti Beef Hatkora 
 
Sylheti Beef curry cooked with Hatxora (a special Sylheti citrus) is a very famous traditional dish usually made at the time of festivals. The cooking style of Sylheti Hatxora is not same the cooking system of Bangladeshis at all. Both of its taste and aroma are different from all other Bangladeshi cuisine. This fruit is commonly used in Sylheti curries. Not only a popular Xatta or Tenga (sour soup) is made with the bones of cow feet and Hatkora but also different kinds of meat is used as well.

Chicken tikka masala 
 
Chicken tikka masala is composed of chicken tikka, boneless chunks of chicken marinated in spices and yogurt. A sauce is usually creamy and orange-coloured is used to cook this curry. The Multicultural Handbook of Food, Nutrition and Dietetics credits its creation to Sylheti migrant chefs in the 1960s. Chicken tikka masala is served in restaurants around the world.

Aash Bash 
 
Aash Bash is one kind of curry made of duck and bamboo shoot. Though it is not as common in all areas as a curry, it is one of the traditional and delicious dishes in Sylheti cuisine. This dish is eaten with rice or Tandoor bread. Aash Bash curry is less spicy in taste.

Phall 

Phall is a British Asian curry which was originated in the British Bangladeshi-owned curry-houses. It is hotter than vindaloo. This dish is a tomato-based thick curry which includes ginger and fennel seeds optionally.

Fish 

Different types of fish curries is available in Sylheti cuisine. Fish is eaten both curry and fried. Dried and fermented fish called Hutki, and Hatkora, a bitter and fragrant citrus fruit are used for cooking curries. Even the extremely hot Naga Morich is used with broths. The most savored local cuisines include Hidol or fermented fish chutney, Hutki Shira or dried fish curry, and various freshwater fish indigenous to this region. It is thought by the locals that excessive spicy hotness of Hidol Chutney is a remedy for colds and headaches.

Hutki Shira 

Hutki Shira is a fermented fish curry made of vegetables, leafy greens and fish or prawns. It is curry without oil or fat. This dish varies on the availability of seasonal vegetables. Traditionally, hidol is used to cook the curry.

Thoikor Tenga 

Thoikor Tenga is a curry dish and very popular in Sylhet. Thoikor is a citrus fruit, it is found almost all over the year in the Sylhet region like Hatkora. It is cooked with small fish.

Delicacy and savory

Bakarkhani 

Sylhety Bakarkhani is completely different from the variants of Dhaka. Dhakai Bakarkhani is a somewhat cookie type snack, where the Sylheti bakarkhani resembles porota a lot. Bakarkhani is an Iftar item in Sylhet. It is also eaten with tea at night during the month of ramadan. Sylheti Bakharkhani can be tasted as savoury or slightly sweet, leavened or unleavened, soft or crisp.

According to a hearsay, Bakarkhani was invented in the middle of the 18th century. It is believed that Bakarkhani was first made by the people of Sylhet. Sylhetis learnt making Bakarkhani from the Afghans who stayed in Sylhet after defeated by the Mughals in 1612. Later many Sylhetis came to Dhaka and started making Bakarkhani commercially. At present most of Dhaka's bakarkhani sellers are from the Sylhet Division.

Biscuits 
From the second half of the 19th century, Europeans and Muslims introduced biscuits and loaves in the Sylhet region that attracted the Muslim community highly. It gained popularity by the Hindus much more later.

Handesh 

Handesh is a sweet and puffy deep-fried snack made of molasses or sugar and flour. It is also known as teler pitha. It is often eaten with tea as a snack. It is very famous on special occasions such as naming ceremonies and wedding festivities and at the time of Eid festival of the Sylhetis.

Nunor Bora 

Nunor Bora also known as Nungora is a savoury rice flour snack. It is made of onion, ginger and turmeric that gives the snack its golden appearance. It is eaten with tea as a snack and is very popular at the time of Eid festival to the Sylhetis. Nunor Bora can be stored in a fridge for a later usage without frying.

Sunga Pitha 

Sunga Fita is a traditional rice cake (pitha). This unique delicacy is prepared by stuffing the sticky rice inside young bamboo and smoke slowly. Once the delicacy is prepared, the rice cake is separated from the tube as a candle. It is also made with binni rice, milk, sugar, coconut, and rice powder.

Tusha Shinni 

Tusha Shinni is a type of flour halwa and a popular desert. This dish is lightly spicy, soft and sweet. It is very famous in different religious occasions. Frying flour and adding it to sugary syrup, Tusha Shinni is prepared. Garnish with raisins, almonds etc. it is served.

See also 
 Cuisine of Bangladesh

References 

 
Food and drink culture
Bangladeshi cuisine
Bangladeshi cuisine in the United Kingdom